With this motto, "The measure of the worth of an organization to its community, is bound in its ability to embrace opportunities for service" the Twentieth Century Club (sometimes referred to as the "20th Century Club") had its beginning in 1894.  Mrs. Walter McNab Miller served as President for an original group of 84 women.  The Club's name was chosen to reflect a look forward to the future and the beginning of the new century.

In 1894, Club members started a circulating library, and in 1898 a scholarship to the University of Nevada was funded.  In 1901, members of the Twentieth Century Club participated in founding the Kindergarten Association and urged the Legislature to establish public kindergartens throughout the state.  During the war years, many hours were devoted to the home-front war effort.

In 1925 a Clubhouse was built on First Street on the river by Roush and Belz.  Through the years the Clubhouse was the pride of its members. Much social life of Reno revolved around the facilities of this Clubhouse – weddings, luncheons, dinner dances, and civic meetings.

Before 1930, the 20th Century Club was involved in a wide variety of causes like passing laws that prohibit spitting on sidewalks, social causes, education and morale. The club's membership peaked at around 1,000 members.
 
In 1980, the Twentieth Century Club sold the building, and the Club's Steinway grand piano was donated to the Reno Philharmonic.

Since 1986 two scholarships are awarded to female students with an interest in medicine.  Currently the scholarships are in the amount of $2500 each.  Monetary donations totaling $20,000 are given to local philanthropic organizations each year, and organized philanthropic endeavors are scheduled at Club meetings throughout the year.

A monthly luncheon is held September through May featuring a program of music or lecturers.

The Twentieth Century Club has entered its third century as the oldest, active women's club in the state of Nevada.

Contact information is as follows:  Twentieth Century Club

The former Twentieth Century Clubhouse, now known as the 20th Century Building still stands today and is located at 335 W. First St. This building is historic and listed on the National Register of Historic Places.  The building was designed by Fred M. Schadler and includes Classical Revival and Prairie School architecture.  It was built in 1925.

The building was listed on the National Register of Historic Places in 1983. It was deemed significant as an "interesting" building designed by a prominent local architect and for association with the Twentieth Century Club, which was "prominent and important" in Reno.

See also 

Humphrey House, 467 Ralston St., Reno, also designed by Schadler and NRHP-listed

References 

Women's club buildings
Women's clubs in the United States
Buildings and structures in Reno, Nevada
Buildings and structures completed in 1925
Clubhouses on the National Register of Historic Places in Nevada
National Register of Historic Places in Reno, Nevada
History of Reno, Nevada
Neoclassical architecture in Nevada
Prairie School architecture in Nevada